Karel Satsuit Tubun (also written as Karel Sadsuitubun; 14 October 1928 – 1 October 1965) was an Indonesian police officer and national hero. A bodyguard for deputy prime minister Johannes Leimena, he was killed while on duty in a scuffle by communists during the 1965 coup d'état.

Karel Satsuit Tubun was born in Tual, Southeast Maluku, on 14 October 1928. He became a police officer, participating in Operation Trikora, and after the transfer of West Irian, he became a bodyguard for deputy prime minister Johannes Leimena. As a bodyguard, he was promoted to the rank of Police Brigadier. On 30 September 1965, communist rebels planned to kidnap and kill members of the armed forces in a coup d'état, including Major General Abdul Haris Nasution, who was in the house next to Leimena's. During the commotion, Tubun woke up and attempted to shoot the rebels. However, he was shot at, and died instantly.

The coup d'état would fail, and in the aftermath, Tubun was declared a national hero. He was posthumously promoted to the rank of Police Second Sub-inspector. A number of things are named in his honor, including an Indonesian frigateknown as the KRI Karel Satsuitubun (356) and an airport.

References

1928 births
1965 deaths
National Heroes of Indonesia
Indonesian Christians